Frenelle-la-Grande is a commune in the Vosges department in Grand Est in northeastern France.

Geography 

Frenelle-la-Grande is adjacent to the department of Meurthe-et-Moselle, at 7 km northwest of Mirecourt. Frenelle-la-Petite is a neighbor to the west.

See also
Communes of the Vosges department

References

Communes of Vosges (department)